Smooth Jazz was a 24-hour music network produced by Jones Radio Networks. Its playlist consisted mostly of contemporary smooth jazz music from artists such as Boney James, Joe Sample, Kenny G, The Rippingtons, David Benoit and a dozen more artists. The format was overseen by Senior Director of Programming Jon Holiday and programmed by Steve Hibbard.

Jones' Smooth Jazz format was discontinued as of September 30, 2008, as part of the integration into the Dial Global brand. Unlike other networks to be eliminated, there is currently no other smooth jazz network with which this network is consolidating. The other most popular network is known as Smooth Jazz Network, provided by Broadcast Architecture, formerly a division of Clear Channel Communications.

At the end, the network had only has a handful of affiliate stations remaining, with some stations formerly affiliated with Jones Smooth Jazz having changed format or gone to the rival syndicated Smooth Jazz format.  Among the Jones Smooth Jazz affiliates remaining, as of August 2008, were the following stations, which were all switched over to Broadcast Architecture's network following the end of Jones Smooth Jazz:

Sample hour of programming
"Cream" - Soul Ballet
"Lowdown" - Boz Scaggs
"X Marks The Spot" - Joe Sample
"That's The Way Love Goes" - Kirk Whalum
"No Ordinary Love" - Sade
"Take Five" - Dave Brubeck
"Morning Dance" - Spyro Gyra
"Tin Tin Deo" - David Sanborn
"Dreamwalk" - Peter White
"What You Won't Do For Love" - Bobby Caldwell
"At Last" - Ronny Jordan
"In The Air Tonight" - Phil Collins
"Palmetto Park" - David Benoit
"Breezin'" - George Benson

External links 
Broadcast Architecture

Defunct radio networks in the United States
Radio formats
Radio stations disestablished in 2008
Defunct radio stations in the United States